A list of films produced in Argentina in 1993:

External links and references
 Argentine films of 1993 at the Internet Movie Database

1993
Argentine
Films